Fill Up the Room is the seventh album by Michigan collective Saturday Looks Good to Me. It was released on October 23, 2007 on K Records.

Track listing

Personnel

Fred Thomas – vocals, guitar, melodica, piano, chamberlin, synthesizer, glockenspiel, electric bass, drum set, percussion, tapes
Scott Sellwood – vocals, melodica, piano, electric piano, harpsichord, organ, glockenspiel, percussion
Dana Carole Beck – vocals
Betty Marie Barnes – vocals
Jacob Danziger – violin
Anna Steinhoff – cello
Zach Wallace – harmonica, double bass
Elliot Bergman – saxophone, organ
Juan Garcia – electric bass, hand claps, percussion
Scott DeRoche – electric bass
Steve Middlekauf – drum set, hand claps, percussion
Charles Koltak – drum set, percussion

References

2007 albums
Saturday Looks Good to Me albums
K Records albums